Nikos Argyropoulos (alternate spelling: Argiropoulos) (born March 25, 1978 in Patras, Greece) is a Greek former professional basketball player. At a height of 1.88 m (6 ft 2 in) tall, he played at the point guard and shooting guard positions

Professional career
Argyropoulos started his professional career with Apollon Patras. After three years in the top-tier Greek 1st Division, Patras moved down to the second-tier Greek 2nd Division for 4 years. In 2003, they returned to the first division. In 2005, he moved to Olympiacos, where he played for one year, and then he moved to Panellinios. He then joined Aris.

He was voted the Greek 2nd Division's MVP in 2012.

National team career
Argyropoulos was a member of the Greek junior national teams. He played at the 1996 FIBA Europe Under-18 Championship.

External links
Euroleague.net Profile
Eurobasket.com Profile
Greek Basket League Profile 

1978 births
Living people
Basketball players from Patras
Apollon Patras B.C. players
Aris B.C. players
Greek men's basketball players
Olympiacos B.C. players
Panellinios B.C. players
Point guards
Shooting guards